Bethany Barratt (born August 18, 1972) is an American political scientist and author.  She writes and researches about human rights and their effects on foreign policy. She is a professor of Political Science at Roosevelt University in Chicago, Illinois, and the director of its Joseph Loundy Human Rights Project, which engages undergraduates in comparative cross-national research on a variety of human rights challenges, especially as they occur in urban settings..

Career
Barratt is the author of Human Rights and Foreign Aid: For Love or Money? (2007, Routledge), Public Opinion and International Intervention: Lessons from the Iraq War (coedited with Peter Furia and Richard Sobel (2011, Potomac), The Politics of Harry Potter, (2011, Palgrave), and Human Rights in The Post-9/11 World: A Sourcebook,(2013, Open Society Foundation), as well as articles in several peer-reviewed journals.

In 2011, Barratt was the co-organizer of a photographic exhibit at Roosevelt University entitled "The Innocents: Headshots", highlighting 45 cases of wrongful convictions. Barratt is currently the director of the Joseph Loundy Human Rights Project.

References

External links
Joseph Loundy Human Rights Project Website

1972 births
American women political scientists
American political scientists
American political writers
21st-century American non-fiction writers
Roosevelt University faculty
Living people
American women non-fiction writers
21st-century American women writers